Dean Alvord (December 4, 1856 – April 18, 1941) was an American real estate developer, college professor, and philanthropist known for his real estate developments in the New York City Metropolitan Area and in Florida. He was a relative of both Johnathan Edwards and Aaron Burr.

Life and career 
Dean Alvord was born in Syracuse, New York on December 4, 1856. He graduated from Syracuse University in 1882. He was a member of Syracuse University's Phi Gamma chapter of the Delta Kappa Epsilon fraternity.

Alvord eventually moved to Brooklyn in New York City in order to continue pursuing his career in real estate and development after initially starting his career in Rochester, New York, where he developed a successful neighborhood. 

He chose the location in part to take advantage of the area's public transportation. Soon afterwards, Alvord developed the Laurelton section of Queens.

In the first decade of the 20th century, Alvord began developing the famed community of Belle Terre in Port Jefferson, New York, ca. 1902–1903.

In 1905, Alvord purchased and developed a large area in Shinnecock Hills on the eastern end of Long Island. Following (and as a result of) this purchase, Alvord became the owner of roughly 10% of Long Island's shoreline.

Around 1908, Alvord began developing another well-known community, Roslyn Estates, New York, which was developed with winding roads and ponds.

Alvord's development corporation went into receivership around 1913. 

Alvord moved to Clearwater, Florida in 1913. He moved there intending to retire, but ultimately continued working as a developer; Alvord continued working as a developer until his death. It was during this time when he developed the Harbor Oaks subdivision of Clearwater, which he opened around 1914. The Harbor Oaks subdivision is now a historic district known as the Harbor Oaks Historic District and is listed on the National Register of Historic Places.

Alvord was also one of the Long Island Motor Parkway's originators. 

Additionally, Alvord briefly taught at Syracuse University, where he had previously attended college, and also served as the General Secretary of the Rochester YMCA.

Development style 
Alvord, who was active in and an advocate for civic improvement and the beautification of streets, was known for making his developments with "park-like atmospheres." He was known for having architects design the homes in his communities to be of various architectural styles, and required that the dwellings built within his communities have setbacks in order to ensure that they all had large front lawns.

Death 
Alvord died on April 18, 1941 at the age of 84 at Tampa Hospital in Tampa, Florida – although some sources state that his death took place in 1937.

Personal life 
Alvord was married to Nellie Barnum, who was a descendant of Alexander Hamilton. Alvord himself was a direct descendant of Johnathan Edwards (and was therefore also a distant relative to Aaron Burr) on his mother's side.

Alvord had two sons and two daughters. He also had a sister, Emily Feigel.

Notable developments 

 Belle Terre, New York
 Harbor Oaks, Florida
Laurelton, Queens
 Prospect Park South, Brooklyn
 Roslyn Estates, New York

References 

People from Syracuse, New York
People from New York City
People from Brooklyn
People from Clearwater, Florida
Real estate and property developers
Syracuse University alumni
Syracuse University faculty
1856 births
1941 deaths